Mitú (stylized in all lowercase) is an English-language Latino media company, multichannel network (MCN) and digital content publisher. In 2016, the network became the largest Hispanic focused digital channel in the world with 2 billion views per month.

Background
mitú was founded in 2012 by Emmy award-winning Beatriz Acevedo, Doug Greiff and Roy Burstin. The networking conglomerate achieved 40 million subscribers across 1200 partner channels by 2014. The company's YouTube channel (we are mitú) has 373,000 direct subscribers as of May 2020. mitú is headquartered in Los Angeles.

Peter Chernin put together a $3 million investment vehicle to initially fund mitú in 2012, and in 2014, Disney's Maker Studios followed with second round funding of $10 million. By 2016, the network was serving 2 billion video views per month on Facebook and YouTube. Series C fuding, which included Verizon, brought venture funding levels to $43 million. In 2018, Acevedo and several top executives were cut from mitú in a reorganization when Maker Studios was folded into Disney Digital Network. Latido Networks, a division of GoDigital Media Group, acquired mitú in early 2020 ,its e-commerce shop mitushop.com and, Latino TV Channel Mitu TV. Their brands include wearemitú, somos mitú, Fierce, crema and Things That Matter.

References 

Multi-channel networks
2012 establishments in California
English-language websites
Hispanic and Latino